In religion, a precursor, also known as forerunner, predecessor, harbinger or herald, is a holy person who announced the approaching appearance of a central figure of the religion or who identified a central figure of the religion during the latter's childhood.

List of precursors
Asita in Buddhism
John the Baptist in Christianity
Bahira or Sergius in Islam
Shaykh Ahmad, forerunner of Bábism (in the Bábí-Bahá'í view)
Sayyid Kazim Rashti, forerunner of Bábism (in the Bábí-Bahá'í view)
Báb, forerunner and herald of the Bahá'í Faith (in the Bahá'í view)

See also
 List of founders of religious traditions

References